Yan Gamarnik (birth name Jakov Tzudikovich Gamarnik, sometimes known as Yakov Gamarnik (– 31 May 1937), was the Chief of the Political Department of the Red Army from 1930—1937, Deputy Commissar of Defense 1930—1934 and First Secretary of the Communist Party of Byelorussia 1928—1930.

Biography

Gamarnik was born in Zhytomyr in a Jewish family as Jakov Tzudikovich Gamarnik. He attended the St Petersburg Psychoneurological Institute and the Law School of Kyiv University. In 1917 he became a member and the secretary of the Kyiv Committee of the Communist Party of the Soviet Union. From 1921 to 1923 Gamarnik was a chairman of the Kyiv city council (see Mayor of Kyiv). During his administration, Kyiv was divided into five districts. He went through many Communist Party positions, both civil and military, e.g. a First Secretary of the Belarusian Communist Party of Belorussia from December 1928 to October 1929.

He was instrumental in preparing the 10-year development plan for the Far-Eastern region of the USSR. He was a member of the Central Committee elected by the 17th Congress of the All-Union Communist Party (Bolsheviks). He attended the Plenum of 23 February 1937.

An idealist, Gamarnik was a staunch supporter of Marshal Tukhachevsky's drive to make USSR a military superpower. In 1937 Gamarnik was accused of participating in an anti-Soviet conspiracy after the Case of Trotskyist Anti-Soviet Military Organization; however, shortly before the trial, he had actually been called upon by the Soviet government to be one of the judges for the accused. He insisted on Tukhachevsky's innocence and later committed suicide before he could be punished for his actions. Only after this was he added to the list of conspirators. He was rehabilitated posthumously by the CC CPSU and Nikita Khrushchev in 1955.

Family 
Gamarnik's sister, Klaudia (born 1905) left school at 14, joined Komsomol in Kyiv in 1921, joined the communist party in 1927, and was working in the prosecutor's office in Moscow when she was expelled from the party on 13 June 1937, arrested on 13 August, and sentenced to eight years in labour camps. Her husband, Andrei Bogomolov, (1902-38), a secretary of the Moscow party committee, was arrested on 17 August 1937, sentenced to death on 25 April 1938, and shot the same day. They had two children, who were aged eight and two in 1937. In 1953, she appealed to have her criminal record removed, but the appeal was turned down on the grounds that she had consorted with 'enemies of the people', inclduing her husband.

Honours and awards
 Order of Lenin (22 February 1933)
 Order of the Red Banner (20 February 1928)
 The town Suchan was named Gamarnik in his honour (1932–1937)

References

Sources
 Robert Conquest, The Great Terror: A Reassessment, Oxford University Press, May 1990, hardcover,  pp 201–202;
 Several versions of Gamarnik biography
 Gamarnik in the Fleet, with photo
 Trotsky about Gamarnik and others
 Profile at Handbook on the history of the Communist Party and the Soviet Union 1898 – 1991

1894 births
Politicians from Zhytomyr
People from Zhitomirsky Uyezd
Jewish Ukrainian politicians
Jews from the Russian Empire
Central Committee of the Communist Party of the Soviet Union members
Central Committee of the Communist Party of Ukraine (Soviet Union) members
Heads of the Communist Party of Byelorussia
Soviet generals
Mayors of Kyiv
Taras Shevchenko National University of Kyiv alumni
Soviet Jews in the military
Recipients of the Order of Lenin
Recipients of the Order of the Red Banner
Case of the Trotskyist Anti-Soviet Military Organization
Soviet politicians who committed suicide
Soviet rehabilitations
1937 suicides